The Italian Armed Forces maintain two types of units who could be called the Italian Marines:

 San Marco Marine Brigade, marines of the Italian Navy (Marina Militare) based in Brindisi.
 Lagunari, amphibious troops of the Italian Army (Esercito Italiano), of the Serenissima Regiment based in Venice.